La X is a Colombian music radio brand for three stations operated and owned by Todelar.

The station in Bogotá airs an English-language adult contemporary format and the Cali station airs an English-language contemporary hit radio format, while the Medellín station airs an electronica format.

Frequencies
Bogotá: 103.9 MHz (HJVU)
Medellín: 103.9 MHz (HJG54)
Cali: 96.5 MHz (HJSQ)

External links
Official site (Bogotá)
Official site (Medellín)
Official site (Cali)

Radio stations in Colombia
Radio stations established in 1982
1982 establishments in Colombia